Aliens, Clowns & Geeks (formerly titled Hipsters, Gangsters, Aliens and Geeks) is a 2019 American science fiction comedy film written and directed by Richard Elfman and starring Bodhi Elfman.  The film features Verne Troyer in his final film appearance.

Cast
Bodhi Elfman as Eddy Pine
Verne Troyer as Emperor Beezel-Chugg
Steve Agee as Jumbo
French Stewart as Professor von Scheisenberg
George Wendt as Father Mahoney
Rebecca Forsythe as Helga Svenson
Angeline-Rose Troy as Inga Svenson
Nic Novicki as Fritz

Release
The film premiered at the 2019 Morbido Film Fest in Mexico City.  The film was also released as a drive-in double feature along with director's cut of Forbidden Zone at the Valley Film Festival on January 30, 2021. It was then released on DVD and Blu-ray on June 7, 2022.

Reception
The film has a 100% rating on Rotten Tomatoes based on eight reviews.

Josh Millican of Dread Central gave the film a positive review and wrote, "This is one of those films that can’t be compared to anything else–a uniquely bizarre experience with the ability to enrage, enthrall, but mostly entertain!"

Tony Sokol of Den of Geek awarded the film four stars out of five and wrote, "Aliens, Clowns & Geeks is silly, goofy, stupidly intelligent, and absolutely what a mad scientist would order."

Alan Ng of Film Threat rated the film a 7 out of 10 and wrote, "There are still filmmakers out there willing to tell stories just for the sake of irreverent fun..."

References

External links
 
 

Films directed by Richard Elfman
American science fiction comedy films
2010s science fiction comedy films
2010s English-language films
2010s American films
Films scored by Danny Elfman